The D'Estienne d'Orves-class avisos, also known as the A69 type avisos, is a class of avisos, comparable in size to a light corvette, mainly designed for coastal anti-submarine defence, but are also available for high sea escort missions (notably in support missions with the FOST). Built on a simple and robust design, they have an economical and reliable propulsion system which allows them to be used for overseas presence missions. They were initially intended for use by the French Navy, but have been ordered by the South African Navy (not delivered), Argentinian Navy and Turkish Navy.

Design and description
The D'Estienne d'Orves-class avisos were primarily designed for anti-submarine warfare (ASW) in coastal areas and colonial coastal patrol. They were ordered as replacements for the E 50 and E 52 type escorteurs of the French Navy.

The two engines are located in a single engine room mounted next to each other and controlled from a room abaft the machinery room. The two diesel engine system was selected due to the preference of endurance over speed.

The class was intended to be constructed in two groups, the A 69 and A 70 types, with the latter type fitted with two Exocet MM38 surface-to-surface missiles (SSM) on either side of the funnel, but in the end, all ships of the class were fitted with the SSMs. The ships are armed with a  CADAM gun turret with Najir fire control system and CMS LYNCEA, a pair of  modèle F2 guns and four  machine guns. For ASW operations, the D'Estienne d'Orves class mounts four fixed catapults for L3 or L5 type torpedoes with no reloads carried and one remote-controlled sextuple  rocket launcher, with 30 reloads carried in a magazine located beneath the aft deckhouse.

The D'Estienne d'Orves class is equipped with one air/surface DRBV 51A sentry radar, one DRBC 32E fire control radar one Decca 1226 navigation radar and DUBA 25 hull-mounted sonar. The DUBA 25 is situated in a fixed dome with a retractable transducer, but is designed strictly for use in coastal waters. As countermeasures the avisos have one ARBR 16 radar interceptor, two Dagaie decoy launchers and one SLQ-25 Nixie countermeasure system, which was fitted in the mid-1980s. The ships have a complement of 90 and have space to accommodate 18 marines.

Modifications
Beyond the Nixie countermeasure system, the funnels aboard the avisos were heightened due to issues with the gases coming from them.  had SEMT Pielstick 12 PA 6 BTC diesels with infrared suppression systems installed which led to delays into the vessel's entry into service. In 1993,  and  had their rocket launchers removed and a Syracuse II satcom terminal installed. Plans were drawn up to give the two ships a hangar and flight deck for helicopters, but this was abandoned.

From 2009, the remaining vessels in French service were reclassified as offshore patrol vessels (OPVs) and, as a result, had their surface-to-surface missiles and heavy anti-submarine weapons removed. All six remaining vessels in the class are planned to be withdrawn from service between 2024 and 2027.

Replacement of these vessels in French service is currently planned from about 2026 by a new class of  patrol vessels.

Ships in the class

South African and Argentine navies 

The first two ships, originally named Lieutenant de vaisseau Le Hénaff and Commandant L'Herminier while under construction for the French Navy, were originally acquired by the South African Navy in 1976. In the French Navy they were replaced by new ships with the same names. The two ships were renamed Good Hope and Transvaal, but due to UN sanctions against South Africa, they were not delivered and were bought by the Argentine Navy on 25 December 1978. A third ship of the class, was ordered by Argentina and was delivered in 1981.

Turkish Navy

In October 2000, Turkey acquired six Type A 69 avisos. They were acquired for the Turkish Navy for coastal patrol in order to release more capable Turkish ships for frontline duty. Five of the six vessels were refitted at Brest before transfer.

Citations

References

External links 

 globalsecurity.org
 Alabordache.com French Aviso in activity
 Alabordache.com French Aviso disarmed
  Argentine Navy (ARA) official site – class specifications & pictures

Corvette classes
Frigate classes
A69 type avisos
Cold War frigates of South Africa
Frigates of France
Corvettes of the French Navy
 
Ship classes of the French Navy